Thiruvalam also known as Thiruvallam, an ancient Temple Town built around Sri Dhanurmadhyambigai Sametha Sri Vilavanadeeswarar Temple, is part of Vellore City.

Demographics
 India census, Thiruvalam had a population of 7945. Males constitute 50% of the population and females 50%. Thiruvalam has an average literacy rate of 72%, higher than the national average of 59.5%: male literacy is 79%, and female literacy is 65%. In Thiruvalam, 11% of the population is under 6 years of age.

References

Cities and towns in Vellore district